Tovomita aequatoriensis is a species of flowering plant in the family Clusiaceae. It is found only in Ecuador. Its natural habitat is subtropical or tropical moist lowland forest. The only threat known so far is habitat destruction.

References

aequatoriensis
Endemic flora of Ecuador
Critically endangered flora of South America
Taxonomy articles created by Polbot